Besagash, previously in the Soviet era: Dzerzhinskoye is a village in Almaty Region in the south-east of Kazakhstan.

External links
Tageo.com

Populated places in Almaty Region